Frank Weston Benson made paintings, drawings and etchings of Wildlife. He also made portraits, waterscapes, landscapes, interiors and other works of art.

Benson, an avid birdwatcher and hunter from a young age, spent nearly every non-winter weekend hunting or fishing. He initially became interested in painting to capture the wildlife he enjoyed, particularly birds. Benson's interest in painting initially grew out of his desire to be an ornithological illustrator. As a teenager, he spent the spring, summer and fall outdoors nearly every weekend bird watching, hunting or fishing. In 1892 Benson bought a hunting shack on Cape Cod with his brothers-in-law, Edward Peirson and Maurice Richardson. Swan Flight, exhibited at the St. Botolph Club in 1893, was Benson's first known exhibition of wildfowl. Entering the turn of the century wildfowl was not a marketable subject, but once he began creating and exhibiting his works the wildfowl paintings always sold.

Benson, a sportsman at heart, had a solid body of work of wildlife scenes and birds, generally waterfowl. His works included oil paintings, watercolors, etchings and drypoint.

Benson made Swan Flight, a group of wild swans in formation against a gray sky from the Cape Cod hunting cabin off of Nauset that he bought with his brothers-in-law. It was the first work he exhibited of wildfowl, a subject matter that Benson explored over the years of his artistic career. The painting was sold soon after it was completed, a dynamic that continued throughout his career. To a New York dealer, Benson once expressed: "I made a [painting of a wildfowl] the other day at home and I looked forward to exhibiting it and, almost before it was dry, a visitor saw it and carried it off! It’s my good fortune to be doing what people like, but it keeps me on the jump." 4

Early Morning" is the culmination of Benson's appreciation of birds and Japanese composition, which was popular both in Boston and Paris. The silhouetted images of the birds flying over water is similar to the Japanese screen by Maruyama Ōkyo "Geese Flying over a Beach". One of Benson's early interests was depiction of the bird life near Salem; His first oil paintings are still lifes of birds. Benson may have seen that screen at Boston importer Bunkyo Matsuki's shop or the Matsuki home in Salem before it was purchased by Charles Freer in 1898. Having seen the work at a New York exhibition in 1900, a New York Times critic noted that it was "especially good… with the ducks in flight and the gray expanse of marsh and sky rose-flushed in the east with the dawn."

Wildlife

References

Bibliography

External links

Frank Weston Benson
Birds in art